Bicho (Polysemical term, meaning: any animal, except to men; a wild animal; or an insect or bug, in Portuguese. In the late 60s it became an endearment term, commonly used as slang in Brazil) is a 1977 studio album by Caetano Veloso. The album was recorded after Veloso spent a month with Gilberto Gil in Lagos, Nigeria, and the influence of African music such as Jùjú can be heard throughout the album.

Track listing

 Odara (Caetano Veloso) - 7:16
 Two naira Fifty kobo (Caetano Veloso) - 5:04
 Gente (Caetano Veloso) - 3:37
 Olha o menino (Jorge Ben) - 3:03
 Um índio (Caetano Veloso) - 2:56
 A grande borboleta (Caetano Veloso) - 1:12
 Tigresa (Caetano Veloso) - 6:21
 O Leãozinho (Caetano Veloso) - 3:06
 Alguém cantando (Caetano Veloso) - 2:43

References

1977 albums
Caetano Veloso albums
Música Popular Brasileira albums
PolyGram albums